Volume Dois (Volume Two) is the ninth studio album released by the Brazilian rock band Titãs. Following the success of the previous album, Acústico MTV, Volume Dois features unplugged arrangements of previously recorded Titãs' songs, along with some new ones. Once again, an orchestra was called to record the album. It is one of their most successful albums, having sold more than 1 million copies as of 2015.

Background and production 
In the final performances of the Acústico MTV tour, Titãs already talked about a future studio album with more acoustic versions of their songs. They were even already performing "É Preciso Saber Viver" by the time.

By the time of the album release, members Tony Bellotto (acoustic and electric guitarist) and Paulo Miklos (vocalist and saxophonist) commented that the band did not want to give in to electronic sounds: "We are a stage band, we like to play. It doesn't make sense, in a numerous band, to wait for the computer sequence before coming in with the guitars. This happened around the times of Õ Blésq Blom (...) Acoustic is the valuing of melodies, the electronic 'thing' more disturbed us than helped us".

The hit "Sonífera Ilha" was chosen as the opening track for being "emblematic. Cheesy, trying to be pop, inventive", according to Bellotto.

When asked if "Caras Como Eu" was a song about feeling old, its author Bellotto replied:

Also asked it the song was a farewell one, he answered:

Release and marketing 
The album was introduced to the press in a press conference hosted at restaurant Terraço Itália, atop Edifício Itália. A promotional tour succeeded, with its shows divided into three parts: one electroacoustic, one acoustic and one more rock-oriented, containing old hits not used in the album. Reproducing the performance of their predecessor in 1997, it was elected by Folha de S.Paulo readers as the best album and show of 1998.

Track listing

Personnel

Titãs 
 Branco Mello - lead vocals, backing vocals
 Charles Gavin - drums and percussion
 Marcelo Fromer - acoustic guitar, electric guitar, backing vocals  (credited, but does not sing)
 Nando Reis - lead vocals, bass guitar, acoustic guitar, backing vocals
 Paulo Miklos - lead vocals, mandolin, banjo, backing vocals
 Sérgio Britto - lead vocals, keyboard, backing vocals
 Tony Bellotto - acoustic guitar, electric guitar, twelve string guitar, slide guitar, backing vocals  (credited, but does not sing)

Guest musicians 
 Liminha - acoustic guitar, electric guitar, bass guitar, twelve string guitar, banjo, tambura, electronic programming
 Fat Family - vocals in "É Preciso Saber Viver"
 Flávio Guimarães - harmonica in "Domingo" and "Lugar Nenhum"
 Jaques Morelenbaum - cello in "Toda Cor", string and Horn arrangements (except in "Eu e Ela", "Miséria" and "Sonífera Ilha")
 Eumir Deodato - string and Horn arrangements in "Eu e Ela" and "Miséria"
 Marcelo Martins - tenor saxophone, flute, string and Horn arrangements in "Sonífera Ilha"
 Ramiro Musotto - percussion in "Sonífera Ilha", "Domingo", "Miséria", "Toda Cor", "Senhor Delegado", "Senhora e Senhor" and "Amanhã não se sabe"
 William Magalhães - keyboard in "Amanhã não se sabe"
 Daniel Garcia - flute, tenor saxophone
 Zé Canuto - flute, tenor saxophone, alto saxophone
 Eduardo Morelembaum - clarinet, bass clarinet
 Philip Doyle - french horn
 Henrique Band - baritone saxophone
 Zé Carlos - tenor saxophone
 Flavio Melo - flugelhorn, trumpet, piccolo trumpet
 Vitor Santos - tenor trombone
 Jessé Sadoc - trumpet, flugelhorn
 Flavio Santos - trumpet
 Altair Martins - trumpet, flugelhorn
 Paulo Roberto Mendonça - trumpet
 Gilberto de Oliveira - bass trombone
 José Machado Ramad - tenor saxophone
 Ismael de Oliveira - horn
 Zdenek Swab - horn
 Antonio Candido - horn
 Giancarlo Pareschi (Spala), José Alves, Bernardo Bessler, Alfredo Vidal, Antonella Pareschi, Paschoal Perrota, Walter Hack, Vera Barreto, Paula Barreto, Michael Bessler, Ricardo Amado: violins
 Marie Cristine Bessler, Frederick Stephany, Jesuina Passaroto, Jairo Diniz: violas
 Alceu Reis, Yura Ranevsky, Marcus de Oliveira, Cassia Menezes, Marcio Malard: cellos

References 

1998 albums
Titãs albums
Warner Music Group albums
Albums produced by Liminha